Royal Air Force Blackbushe or more simply RAF Blackbushe is a former Royal Air Force station in Hampshire, England, during the Second World War. It is now Blackbushe Airport.

History
The station was opened on 1 November 1942 as RAF Hartford Bridge and it was used throughout the remainder of Second World War for reconnaissance, defence and strike operations using Supermarine Spitfires, Douglas Bostons and de Havilland Mosquitoes. It was also the home of the Free French Squadron (Lorraine).

During the construction of the airfield, the already built runways were used for glider testing, including the massive General Aircraft Hamilcar.

A number of important people used the airfield including King George VI and Queen Elizabeth, Supreme Allied Commander U.S. General Dwight D Eisenhower and British Field Marshal Bernard Montgomery.

Due to its geographical proximity to RAE Farnborough Royal Aircraft Establishment the airfield was used to develop the Fog Investigation and Dispersal Operation (FIDO) system to enable aircraft operations in heavy fog.

The station was renamed to RAF Blackbushe on 18 November 1944 and it became an airfield for the Douglas Dakotas of RAF Transport Command during the 1948 airlift during the Berlin Blockade.

The RAF Station was closed on 15 November 1946 and in February 1947 the airfield became Blackbushe Airport under the control of the Ministry of Civil Aviation. During the 1950s the airfield saw increased used as a base for US Navy transport aircraft.

Blackbushe was also considered during WWII in consultations to decide the site of London's post-war principal civil airport. It was only narrowly beaten by Heathrow; the winner was announced in 1944.

Units and aircraft (RAF Hartford Bridge)

Units and aircraft (RAF Blackbushe)

Units

Accidents and incidents

On 8 October 1945 a Consolidated B-24 Liberator GR.VI aircraft of No. 311 (Czechoslovak) Squadron RAF took off from Blackbushe on a flight to Ruzyně Airport, Prague. Five minutes later it crashed and burst into flames in a field at Elvetham, near Hartley Wintney, southwest of Blackbush. All 23 people aboard were Czechoslovak, and all were killed: five crew, 17 passengers and one stowaway. The passengers included nine women and five young children, the latter ranging from 18 months to three years old.

References

Citations

Bibliography

 Sturtivant, Ray, ISO and John Hamlin. RAF Flying Training And Support Units since 1912. Tonbridge, Kent, UK: Air-Britain (Historians) Ltd., 2007. .

External links

RAF Blackbushe at controltowers.co.uk

Royal Air Force stations in Hampshire
Royal Air Force stations of World War II in the United Kingdom
Military airbases established in 1942
Military installations closed in 1946
1942 establishments in England
1946 disestablishments in England